Bucculatrix anthemidella is a moth in the family Bucculatricidae. It is found in Kyrgyzstan and Ukraine. The species was first described by G. Deschka in 1972.

The larvae feed on Anthemis tinctoria. They mine the leaves of their host plant.

References

Natural History Museum Lepidoptera generic names catalog

Moths described in 1972
Bucculatricidae
Moths of Asia
Moths of Europe